Charles J. Guth (1856 in Chicago – July 5, 1883 in Cambridge, Massachusetts) was a professional baseball player who played pitcher in the Major Leagues in 1880. He played one game for the Chicago White Stockings.
Guth was a semi-professional player who was called up to pitch due to both Larry Corcoran and Fred Goldsmith being ill.

Death
Three years after making his debut, Guth died from asthenia.

References

External links

1856 births
1883 deaths
Major League Baseball pitchers
Chicago White Stockings players
19th-century baseball players
Baseball players from Chicago